William Oliver "Whitey" Overton (born October 10, 1928, in Montgomery, Alabama - July 1, 2015  in Lancaster, Ohio) was an American track and field athlete known for the steeplechase.  As a 19 year old at Alabama Polytechnic, he represented the United States at the 1948 Olympics.  He finished a non-qualifying 6th place in the opening heats, running 10.14.4.  The time was significantly inferior to his personal best of 9:26.0, set earlier in 1948.  Overton's road to the Olympics was made more dramatic at the 1948 Olympic Trials when he hit the final barrier and fell.  He was able to get back to his feet, sprint to the line and still finish ahead of Forest Efaw in 9:28.4.

References

1928 births
2015 deaths
Athletes (track and field) at the 1948 Summer Olympics
Olympic track and field athletes of the United States
American male steeplechase runners
Auburn Tigers men's track and field athletes
Sportspeople from Montgomery, Alabama